Olivier Arnaud (born 14 October 1987) is a French rugby league player who has played for France.

Playing career
Arnaud plays for Sporting Olympique Avignon and made his debut for France in 2015 against Wales.

Arnaud was named in the French squad for the 2017 Rugby League World Cup.

References

External links
2017 RLWC profile

1987 births
Living people
France national rugby league team players
French rugby league players
Rugby league wingers
Sporting Olympique Avignon players